Devon Eugene Lowery (born March 24, 1983) is a retired professional baseball pitcher, who played for the Kansas City Royals in 2008.

Professional career
Lowery was drafted by the Kansas City Royals in the 14th round of the 2001 Major League Baseball Draft. After seven years in the minors, he was called up for the first time on September 1, . After retiring, he became a coach in the Royals' farm system.

External links

1983 births
Living people
African-American baseball coaches
African-American baseball players
Arizona League Royals players
Baseball players from North Carolina
Burlington Bees players
Gulf Coast Royals players
High Desert Mavericks players
Idaho Falls Chukars players
Kansas City Royals players
Major League Baseball pitchers
Minor league baseball coaches
Northwest Arkansas Naturals players
Omaha Royals players
Wichita Wranglers players
Wilmington Blue Rocks players
21st-century African-American sportspeople
20th-century African-American people